Attila Lőrinczy (born 8 April 1994) is a Hungarian football player who plays for Diósgyőr.

Career
On 16 December 2022, Lőrinczy signed a contract with Diósgyőr.

Club statistics

Updated to games played as of 15 May 2021.

References
MLSZ
HLSZ

1994 births
Living people
Footballers from Budapest
Hungarian footballers
Hungary youth international footballers
Hungary under-21 international footballers
Association football midfielders
Budapest Honvéd FC players
Békéscsaba 1912 Előre footballers
Szolnoki MÁV FC footballers
FC Ajka players
Mosonmagyaróvári TE 1904 footballers
Soroksár SC players
Budafoki LC footballers
Diósgyőri VTK players
Nemzeti Bajnokság I players
Nemzeti Bajnokság II players